Pierre-Henri Raphanel (born 27 May 1961) is a French former racing driver.

He participated in 17 Formula One Grands Prix for Larrousse, Coloni and Rial, debuting on 13 November 1988. He only qualified for one race, the 1989 Monaco Grand Prix, making him the only driver in F1 history whose only race was in the principality.

Following his F1 career, he became a factory driver for Toyota, competing in Japan for series such as JTCC and JGTC, for the latter until 2000. After 2006 Raphanel worked as the lead test driver and product specialist for Bugatti and is usually seen demonstrating the Veyron.

Pierre-Henri Raphanel is also the uncle of the French-Algerian driver Julien Gerbi and of the young go-kart driver Arthur Raphanel.

He drove the Bugatti Veyron Super Sport to its maximum speed (431.072 km/h) in Ehra-Lessien in July 2010.

Racing record

Complete Macau Grand Prix results

24 Hours of Le Mans results

Complete Formula One results
(key)

Complete JGTC results
(key) (Races in bold indicate pole position) (Races in italics indicate fastest lap)

References

External links 

French racing drivers
French Formula One drivers
Larrousse Formula One drivers
Coloni Formula One drivers
Rial Formula One drivers
French Formula Three Championship drivers
International Formula 3000 drivers
Sportspeople from Algiers
Japanese Touring Car Championship drivers
1961 births
Living people
24 Hours of Le Mans drivers
Bugatti people
World Sportscar Championship drivers
21st-century Algerian people
Long Distance Series drivers
Oreca drivers
TOM'S drivers
Team Joest drivers
Peugeot Sport drivers
Porsche Motorsports drivers